Jorge Juan was a  sloop of the Spanish Navy which was sunk off Cuba during the Spanish–American War.

Technical characteristics
Jorge Juan was built at La Seyne in France. She was launched in 1876. She had a composite hull, one funnel, one screw, and a barque rig. She was the lead ship of a class of two sloops.

Operational history
During the Spanish–American War in 1898, Jorge Juan was in Cuba. She was anchored in Nipe Bay when, late on the morning of 21 July 1898, the United States Navy armed yacht  and armed tug  moved in toward Port Nipe in order to reconnoitre the bay. Wasp immediately sighted Jorge Juan at anchor some four miles up the bay. Wasp fired several shots at the signal station located at the bay's entrance, then sped forward to engage Jorge Juan. At 1244, Jorge Juan opened fire at extreme range, and Wasp returned fire immediately. As the range decreased, American gunfire became more accurate, and all four ships began scoring telling hits on Jorge Juan. Finally, at 1312, Jorge Juan stuck her colors. The four American warships ceased fire and watched Jorge Juan sink at 1342.

Notes

References

 
 Chesneau, Roger, and Eugene M. Kolesnik, Eds. Conway's All The World's Fighting Ships 1860–1905. New York, New York: Mayflower Books Inc., 1979. .

Sloops
Ships of the Spanish Navy
Ships built in France
Spanish–American War naval ships of Spain
1876 ships
Maritime incidents in 1898
Shipwrecks in the Caribbean Sea
Shipwrecks of the Spanish–American War